Çayqaraqoyunlu (also, Çay Qaraqoyunlu, Chaykarakoyunlu, and Chay-Karakoyunly) is a village and municipality in the Shaki Rayon of Azerbaijan.  It has a population of 1,560.

References 

Populated places in Shaki District